Gail Gaymer Martin (born 1937) is a Christian speaker and an American novelist.

Early life and career 
Gail Martin was born in 1937 and raised in Michigan.

Martin started her career in writing when she formatted several Christmas programs for her church and submitted them to CSS Publishing in September 1994. She received her first book contract in January 1995, six months before she retired from her job as a counselor at Madison High School in Madison Heights, Michigan. She sold her first novel to Barbour Publishing in 1998, and it was released in October 1998.   Her second novel was sold shortly thereafter; it was released in May 1999 and that same year in June she sold to Steeple Hill.

Awards 
In 2002, Martin won the American Christian Fiction Writers (ACFW)'s Carol Award in the short contemporary romance category for A Love For Safe Keeping.

Personal life 
Martin lives with her husband, Bob, who is also her proofreader. Along with writing, Gail enjoys music and singing as a soloist and choir member at her church. She is a member of the Detroit Lutheran Singers. Gail also plays hand chimes and handbells.

Books

Novels 
Seasons (1998) 
Dreaming of Castles (1999) 
Better to See You in Once Upon a Time (2000) 
Upon a Midnight Clear (2000) 
Yuletide Treasures in Christmas Thread (2000) 
To Keep Me Warm in Home For Christmas (2001) ISBN
Apple of His Eye in The English Garden (2001) 
Her Longing Secret (2001) 
Secrets of the Heart (2001) 
Let's Pretend... (2002) 
Once a Stranger in German Enchantment (2002) 
Over Her Head (2002) 
A Love For Safe Keeping (2002) 
The Christmas Kite (2003) 
All Good Gifts in The Harvest (2003 co-authored with Cynthia Rutledge) 
The Butterfly Garden in Easter Blessings (2003 co-authored with Lenora Worth) 
Then Came Darkness Hidden Motives (2004) 
That Christmas Feeling Christmas Moon (2004 Hardcover) 
Michigan (2004) 
An Open Door From Italy With Love (2004) 
Adam's Promise (2005) Large Print 
Out on a Limb (2005) 
Finding Christmas (2005) 
Christmas Moon (2005 Paperback, co-authored with Catherine Palmer) 
Mackinac Island Anthology (2006)

Loving series 

 Loving Treasures (2002) 
 Loving Hearts (2003) 
 Loving Ways (2003) 
 Loving Care (2004) 
 Loving Promises (2005) 
 Loving Feelings (2005) 
 Loving Tenderness (2005)

Monterey Peninsula series 

 And Baby Makes Five (2007)

Michigan Island series 

 In His Eyes (2006) 
 With Christmas in His Heart (2006) 
 In His Dreams (2007) 
 Family in His Heart (2008)

Nonfiction 

 Writing The Christian Romance (2007)

References

External links
 
 

20th-century American novelists
21st-century American novelists
American women novelists
Writers from Detroit
American romantic fiction writers
Living people
Women romantic fiction writers
20th-century American women writers
21st-century American women writers
Novelists from Michigan
1937 births